The Saint-Gall Cantatorium is the earliest surviving cantatorium of Gregorian chant. It was produced around 922–926 in the Abbey of Saint Gall and is still held in the abbey library.

Sources
Jacques Hourlier, La notation musicale des chants liturgiques latins, Abbaye Saint-Pierre, Solesmes 1996 72 p.

References 
 Digitized manuscript online

Western plainchant
10th-century illuminated manuscripts
Manuscripts of the Abbey library of Saint Gall
Music illuminated manuscripts